is a former Japanese football player.

Playing career
Shimizu was born in Takasaki on October 4, 1976. After graduating from high school, he joined Júbilo Iwata in 1995. He played many matches as offensive midfielder and forward from 1997. The club won the champions 1997, 1999 J1 League and 1998 J.League Cup. In Asia, the club won the champions 1998–99 Asian Club Championship and the 2nd place 1999–2000 Asian Club Championship. In September 2000, he moved to J2 League club Consadole Sapporo on loan. In 2001, he returned to Júbilo Iwata. In late 2001, he became a regular player instead Naohiro Takahara moved to Boca Juniors. In 2002, he moved to Yokohama F. Marinos. In 2002, he played as regular player as forward. From 2003, although his opportunity to play decreased, he played many matches as substitute and the club won the champions for 2 years in a row (2003-2004). In 2011, he moved to Avispa Fukuoka. However he could hardly play in the match and retired end of 2011 season.

Club statistics

J1 League Firsts
 Appearance: April 16, 1997. Júbilo Iwata 1 vs 0 Avispa Fukuoka, Hakatanomori Football Stadium
 Goal: August 16, 1997. Júbilo Iwata 2 vs 1 Vissel Kobe, Yamaha Stadium

References

External links

1976 births
Living people
Association football people from Gunma Prefecture
Japanese footballers
J1 League players
J2 League players
Júbilo Iwata players
Hokkaido Consadole Sapporo players
Yokohama F. Marinos players
Avispa Fukuoka players
Association football midfielders